Tryblidium is a paleozoic genus of Ordovician and Silurian monoplacophorans.

The generic name comes from the Greek (τρυβλίον), which means patella.

Species 
Species in the genus Tryblidium include:
 Tryblidium acutum
 Tryblidium arctica
 Tryblidium erato
 Tryblidium eubule
 Tryblidium exserta
 Tryblidium hyrie
 Tryblidium modestum
 Tryblidium niobe
 Tryblidium nycteis
 Tryblidium ovale
 Tryblidium ovatum
 Tryblidium pileolum
 Tryblidium reticulatum
 Tryblidium rugosum
 Tryblidium simplex
 Tryblidium thorsteinssoni

See also 
 Triblidium esthonum is a synonym for Pilina esthonum.
 Tryblidium radiatum is a synonym for Helcionopsis radiatum.
 Tryblidium unguis is a synonym for Pilina unguis.

References

Prehistoric monoplacophorans
Prehistoric mollusc genera
Ordovician first appearances
Silurian extinctions
Paleozoic life of Nunavut
Paleozoic life of Quebec